This is a list of notable warehouse districts.

A warehouse district or warehouse row is an area found in many urban setting known for being the current or former location of numerous warehouses. Logistically, warehouses are often located in industrial parks, with access to bulk transportation outlets such as highways, railroads, and airports. The areas where warehouses are typically built are often designated as special zones for urban planning purposes, and "can have their own substantial infrastructures, comprising roads, utilities, and energy systems". In many instances, where changing social and economic conditions have made it unfeasible to maintain an existing warehouse district, cities or communities will invest in converting the district to other purposes for which this infrastructure can still be used, such as an art district. Such a converted area may continue to be known as a warehouse district.

Notable areas known as warehouse districts include:

Canada
 Distillery District is located in Toronto, Ontario and is the largest collection of Victorian-era industrial architecture in North America.

Germany
 Speicherstadt in Hamburg, Germany

United Kingdom
Harringay Warehouse District

United States (by state then city)

Arizona
Tucson Warehouse Historic District, Tucson, listed on the NRHP in Pima County

Arkansas
Hot Springs Railroad Warehouse Historic District, Hot Springs, listed on the NRHP in Garland County

California
Warehouse Row Fresno, listed on the NRHP in Fresno County
Warehouse District, Los Angeles
Oakland Waterfront Warehouse District, Oakland, listed on the NRHP in Alameda County

Georgia
Athens Warehouse Historic District, Athens, listed on the NRHP in Clarke County
East Vine Street Warehouse and Depot District, Statesboro, listed on the NRHP in Bulloch County

Idaho
Pocatello Warehouse Historic District, Pocatello, listed on the NRHP in Bannock County
Twin Falls Warehouse Historic District, Twin Falls, listed on the NRHP in Twin Falls County

Illinois
 Fulton River District, Chicago
 Warehouse District, Chicago, Chicago
 Warehouse Historic District, Peoria, listed on the NRHP in Peoria County, Illinois

Iowa
Crescent Warehouse Historic District, Davenport, listed on the NRHP in Scott County

Kansas
Wichita Historic Warehouse and Jobbers District, Wichita, listed on the NRHP in Sedgwick County

Kentucky
Warehouse District, Danville, listed on the National Register of Historic Places in Boyle County
Hopkinsville Warehouse Historic District, Hopkinsville, listed on the NRHP in Christian County

Louisiana
 New Orleans Central Business District, New Orleans

Michigan
River Place, Detroit, listed on the NRHP in Wayne County

Minnesota
Minneapolis Warehouse Historic District, Minneapolis, Minnesota, listed on the NRHP in Hennepin County
North Loop, Minneapolis, which includes the Minneapolis Warehouse Historic District

Missouri
Warehouse Row Historic District, Cape Girardeau, listed on the NRHP in Cape Girardeau County
Walnut Street Warehouse and Commercial Historic District, Kansas City, listed on the NRHP in Jackson County
Cupples Warehouse District, St. Louis, listed on the NRHP in St. Louis, Missouri
 Washington Avenue Loft District, St. Louis
Springfield Warehouse and Industrial Historic District, Springfield, listed on the NRHP in Greene County

New York
Meatpacking District, New York
Larkin District, Buffalo

North Carolina
Greenville Tobacco Warehouse Historic District, Greenville, listed on the NRHP in Pitt County
Wilson Central Business-Tobacco Warehouse Historic District, Wilson, listed on the NRHP in Wilson County
Warehouse (Raleigh), Raleigh

Ohio
Cincinnati East Manufacturing and Warehouse District, Cincinnati, listed on the NRHP
Cleveland Warehouse District, Cleveland, listed on the NRHP in Cleveland, Ohio
Huron-Superior Streets Warehouse-Produce Historic District, Toledo, listed on the NRHP in Lucas County

Pennsylvania
Strip District, Pittsburgh

South Carolina
Waccamaw River Warehouse Historic District, Conway, listed on the NRHP in Horry County

South Dakota
Old Courthouse and Warehouse Historic District, Sioux Falls, listed on the NRHP in Minnehaha County

Tennessee
Market Street Warehouse Historic District, Chattanooga, listed on the NRHP in Hamilton County
Johnson City Warehouse and Commerce Historic District, Johnson City, listed on the NRHP in Washington County
Jackson Avenue Warehouse District, Knoxville, listed on the NRHP in Knox County
Southern Terminal and Warehouse Historic District, Knoxville, listed on the NRHP in Knox County
South Bluffs Warehouse Historic District, Memphis, listed on the NRHP in Shelby County

Texas
 EaDo, Houston
 Warehouse District, Austin
 West End Historic District, Dallas, Texas, Dallas

Utah
Warehouse District, Salt Lake City, listed on the National Register of Historic Places in Salt Lake County

Virginia
Danville Tobacco Warehouse and Residential District, Danville, listed on the NRHP in Danville
Roanoke Warehouse Historic District, Roanoke, listed on the NRHP in Roanoke

Washington
Desmet Avenue Warehouse Historic District, Spokane, listed on the NRHP in Spokane County 
Union Depot-Warehouse Historic District, Tacoma, listed on the NRHP in Pierce County

West Virginia
Morgantown Wharf and Warehouse Historic District, Morgantown, listed on the NRHP in Monongalia County
Wheeling Warehouse Historic District, Wheeling, listed on the NRHP in Ohio County

Wisconsin
Historic Third Ward, Milwaukee, Milwaukee

References

See also
 Arts district
 Loft apartment

 
Warehouse districts